The Upper Dauphin Area High School is a small, rural, public high school. It is the sole high school operated by Upper Dauphin Area School District which is located in Dauphin County, Pennsylvania. The high school serves the boroughs of Lykens, Elizabethville, Gratz, Berrysburg, and Pillow, as well as Jefferson Township, Washington Township, Mifflin Township, and Lykens Township.

In 2015, enrollment was 386 pupils in 9th through 12th grades. In 2014, Upper Dauphin Area High School enrollment was reported as 396 pupils in 9th through 12th grades, with 33% of pupils eligible for a free lunch due to family poverty. Additionally, 13.3% of pupils received special education services, while less than 1% of pupils were identified as gifted. The school employed 27 teachers.

The Capital Area Intermediate Unit IU15 provides the school with a wide variety of services like specialized education for disabled students and hearing, speech and visual disability services and professional development for staff and faculty. Students do not have access to vocational and trade education outside of the district's limited program (Agriculture, Job-Seeking Skills and Carpentry).

Extracurriculars
Upper Dauphin Area School District offers a wide variety of clubs, activities and sports.

Sports
The district funds:

Boys
Baseball - AA
Basketball- AA
Football - A
Soccer - A
Track and Field AA
 Wrestling	 - AA

Girls
Basketball - A
Cheer - AAAA (added 2013)
Soccer (Fall) - A
Softball - AA
Track and Field - AA
Volleyball - A

Middle School Sports

Boys
Basketball
Wrestling	

Girls
Basketball

According to PIAA directory July 2012

References

Public high schools in Pennsylvania
Susquehanna Valley
Schools in Dauphin County, Pennsylvania
Educational institutions in the United States with year of establishment missing